Colayrac-Saint-Cirq is a commune in the Lot-et-Garonne department in south-western France.

Twin towns
Colayrac-Saint-Cirq is twinned with:

  San Fior, Italy

See also
Communes of the Lot-et-Garonne department

References

Colayracsaintcirq